is a Japanese company specializing in the manufacturing of electric connectors. The company was founded in 1937 as Hirose Manufacturing, changed its name to Hirose Electric in August 1963 and started selling internationally in 1968.

Hirose also manufactures flexible printed circuits for smartphones and gets about 70 percent of revenue from outside Japan.

Connectors 
Hirose is mainly known for its ".FL" series of surface-mount connectors, the best-known being Hirose U.FL used in Wi-Fi equipment. They include:

Product gallery

See also

 Hirose U.FL connector, used in Wi-Fi equipment
 Hirose W.FL connector

References

External links
 —
 HIROSE Product Search

Electronics companies of Japan
Engineering companies of Japan
Defunct defense companies of Japan
Manufacturing companies based in Tokyo
Electronics companies established in 1937
Japanese companies established in 1937
Companies listed on the Tokyo Stock Exchange
Japanese brands